Sarrin (also spelled Serrin or Sareen) is a town in northern Syria, administratively part of the Aleppo Governorate, located northeast of Aleppo. It is situated 3 kilometers east of the Euphrates River, south of Kobanî and east of Manbij.

In the 2004 census, the town of Sarrin had a population of 6,140, while the Sarrin subdistrict had a total population of 70,522 mostly Arab.

During the Syrian Civil War, the Islamic State of Iraq and the Levant seized control of the town in September 2013. In March 2015, Kurds from the People's Protection Units (YPG), alongside Free Syrian Army (FSA) rebels, launched an attack to take control of the strategic town. On July 27, 2015, the town came under the control of Kurdish YPG forces.

See also 
 Battle of Sarrin (June–July 2015)

References

Populated places in Ayn al-Arab District
Towns in Aleppo Governorate
Populated places on the Euphrates River